In Greek mythology, the female name Polymede (Ancient Greek: Πολυμήδη) may refer to:

Polymede, daughter of Autolycus by Mestra, Neaera or Amphithea and the possible mother of Jason by Aeson, King of Iolcus. She was also called Polymele or Polypheme, otherwise the mother of the hero was either Amphinome, Theognete, daughter of Laodicus, Rhoeo, Arne or Scarphe.
Polymede, mother of Nestor by Neleus, king of Pylos. Otherwise, Nestor's mother was known as Chloris, a Minyan princess and daughter of King Amphion of Orchomenus.

Notes

Women in Greek mythology

References 

 Apollodorus, The Library with an English Translation by Sir James George Frazer, F.B.A., F.R.S. in 2 Volumes, Cambridge, MA, Harvard University Press; London, William Heinemann Ltd. 1921. . Online version at the Perseus Digital Library. Greek text available from the same website.
Diodorus Siculus, The Library of History translated by Charles Henry Oldfather. Twelve volumes. Loeb Classical Library. Cambridge, Massachusetts: Harvard University Press; London: William Heinemann, Ltd. 1989. Vol. 3. Books 4.59–8. Online version at Bill Thayer's Web Site  Diodorus Siculus, Bibliotheca Historica. Vol 1-2. Immanel Bekker. Ludwig Dindorf. Friedrich Vogel. in aedibus B. G. Teubneri. Leipzig. 1888-1890. Greek text available at the Perseus Digital Library.
 Hesiod, Catalogue of Women from Homeric Hymns, Epic Cycle, Homerica translated by Evelyn-White, H G. Loeb Classical Library Volume 57. London: William Heinemann, 1914. Online version at theio.com
 Tzetzes, John, Allegories of the Iliad translated by Goldwyn, Adam J. and Kokkini, Dimitra. Dumbarton Oaks Medieval Library, Harvard University Press, 2015. 
Tzetzes, John, Book of Histories, Book V-VI translated by Konstantinos Ramiotis from the original Greek of T. Kiessling's edition of 1826.  Online version at theio.com.

Phocian characters in Greek mythology
Characters from Iolcus
Messenian mythology